James Newsom Roberts  (October 13, 1895 in Artesia, Mississippi – June 24, 1984 in Columbus, Mississippi), nicknamed "Big Jim", was a pitcher in Major League Baseball. He pitched in twelve games for the Brooklyn Robins during the 1924 and 1925 seasons. He attended  Mississippi State University.

External links

1895 births
1984 deaths
Baseball players from Mississippi
Major League Baseball pitchers
Brooklyn Robins players
Montgomery Rebels players
New Orleans Pelicans (baseball) players
San Antonio Bears players
Little Rock Travelers players
Nashville Vols players
Wichita Falls Spudders players
Jersey City Skeeters players
Mississippi State Bulldogs baseball players